Luke Muller (born March 14, 1996) is an American sailor. He competed in the Finn event at the 2020 Summer Olympics.

References

External links
 
 
 

1996 births
Living people
American male sailors (sport)
Olympic sailors of the United States
Sailors at the 2020 Summer Olympics – Finn
People from Fort Pierce, Florida